Paul Alexander Slack FBA (born 23 January 1943) is a British historian. He is a former principal of Linacre College, Oxford, pro-vice-chancellor of the University of Oxford, and professor of early modern social history in the University of Oxford.

Life

Slack was educated at Bradford Grammar School, the University of Oxford (BA, DPhil). He was a fellow of Exeter College, Oxford, from 1973 until 1996. He served as junior proctor during the academic year 1986–87 and chairman of the General Board 1995–96. 

On 1 October 1996, he took office as principal of Linacre College.  He retired in September 2010. He was appointed pro-vice-chancellor in 1997, becoming in 2000 pro-vice-chancellor (academic services and university collections). 

In 1999 he was appointed professor of early modern social history. He is also a member of the Environmental Change Institute advisory board and a former chairman of the curators of the University Libraries.

Slack was elected a Fellow of the British Academy in 1990.

Publications

Author

Paul Slack,  Plague: A Very Short Introduction (Oxford University Press, Second Edition, 2021; ISBN 978-019887111-8)
Paul Slack, The English Poor Law, 1531-1782 (Basingstoke: Macmillan Education, 1990; Cambridge: Cambridge University Press, 1995)
Paul Slack, From Reformation to improvement: public welfare in early modern England (Oxford: Clarendon Press, 1998; 1999)
Paul Slack, The impact of plague in Tudor and Stuart England (London; Boston: Routledge & Kegan Paul, 1985; reprinted with corrections, Oxford: Clarendon Press, 1985)
Paul Slack, Poverty and policy in Tudor and Stuart England (London: Longman, 1988)
Paul Slack, "Poverty and politics in Salisbury 1597-1666", in Peter Clark and Paul Slack, eds, Crisis and order in English towns, 1500-1700: essays in urban history (London: Routledge & Kegan Paul; Toronto: University of Toronto Press, 1972), pp. 164–203
Paul Slack: "Social Policy and the Constraints of Government, 1547–58", in Jennifer Loach and Robert Tittler, eds, The Mid-Tudor Polity c. 1540–1560 (London: Macmillan), pp. 94–115
Paul Slack, The Traditional community under stress (Milton Keynes: Open University Press, 1977)

Editor

Paul Slack, ed., Environments and historical change (Oxford: Oxford University Press, 1999)
Paul Slack, ed., Poverty in early-Stuart Salisbury (Devizes: Wiltshire Record Society, 1975)
Paul Slack, ed., Rebellion, popular protest, and the social order in early modern England (Cambridge: Cambridge University Press, 1984)

Co-editor

Peter Burke, Brian Harrison, and Paul Slack, eds, Civil histories: essays presented to Sir Keith Thomas (Oxford: Oxford University Press, 2000)
Peter Clark and Paul Slack, eds, Crisis and order in English towns, 1500-1700: essays in urban history (London: Routledge & Kegan Paul; Toronto: University of Toronto Press, 1972)
Peter Clark and Paul Slack, English towns in transition 1500-1700 (London: Oxford University Press, 1976)
Terence Ranger and Paul Slack, eds, Epidemics and ideas: essays on the historical perception of pestilence (Cambridge: Cambridge University Press, 1992)
Julie Trottier and Paul Slack, eds, Managing water resources past and present (Oxford: Oxford University Press, 2004)
Paul Slack and Ryk Ward, eds, The peopling of Britain: the shaping of a human landscape (Oxford: Oxford University Press, 2002)
John Morrill, Paul Slack, and Daniel Woolf, eds, Public duty and private conscience in seventeenth-century England: essays presented to G.E. Aylmer (Oxford: Clarendon Press, 1993)

External links
5th IT Support Staff Conference, University Museum, Keble College, and Computing Laboratory (University of Oxford) on Thursday, 29 June 2000: Who's Who?
A state of singularitie, Oxford Today 14:3 (Trinity Term 2002)
Environmental Change Institute Advisory Board
Oxford University Gazette (16 November 1995)
British Academy Fellows Archive

Living people
1943 births
Fellows of Exeter College, Oxford
Fellows of Linacre College, Oxford
Fellows of St John's College, Oxford
Fellows of the British Academy
Pro-Vice-Chancellors of the University of Oxford
English historians
English lawyers
Principals of Linacre College, Oxford
English male non-fiction writers